Bailey Green is a village in Hampshire, England.

Villages in Hampshire